JUnit is a unit testing framework for the Java programming language. JUnit has been important in the development of test-driven development, and is one of a family of unit testing frameworks which is collectively known as xUnit that originated with SUnit.

JUnit is linked as a JAR at compile-time. The latest version of the framework, JUnit 5, resides under package org.junit.jupiter. Previous versions JUnit 4 and JUnit 3 were under packages org.junit and junit.framework, respectively.

A research survey performed in 2013 across 10,000 Java projects hosted on GitHub found that JUnit (in a tie with slf4j-api) was the most commonly included external library. Each library was used by 30.7% of projects.

Example of a JUnit test fixture
A JUnit test fixture is a Java object. Test methods must be annotated by the @Test annotation. If the situation requires it, it is also possible to define a method to execute before (or after) each (or all) of the test methods with the @BeforeEach (or @AfterEach) and @BeforeAll (or @AfterAll) annotations.

import org.junit.jupiter.api.*;

public class FoobarTest {
    @BeforeAll
    public static void setUpClass() throws Exception {
        // Code executed before the first test method
    }

    @BeforeEach
    public void setUp() throws Exception {
        // Code executed before each test
    }
 
    @Test
    public void oneThing() {
        // Code that tests one thing
    }

    @Test
    public void anotherThing() {
        // Code that tests another thing
    }

    @Test
    public void somethingElse() {
        // Code that tests something else
    }

    @AfterEach
    public void tearDown() throws Exception {
        // Code executed after each test 
    }
 
    @AfterAll
    public static void tearDownClass() throws Exception {
        // Code executed after the last test method 
    }
}

Previous versions of JUnit
According to Martin Fowler, one of the early adopters of JUnit:

As a side effect of its wide use, previous versions of JUnit remain popular, with JUnit 4 having over 100,000 usages by other software components on the Maven Central repository.

In JUnit 4, the annotations for test execution callbacks were @BeforeClass, @Before, @After, and @AfterClass, as opposed to JUnit 5's @BeforeAll, @BeforeEach, @AfterEach, and @AfterAll.

In JUnit 3, test fixtures had to inherit from junit.framework.TestCase. Additionally, test methods had to be prefixed with 'test'.

See also

 xUnit, the family name given to testing frameworks including JUnit
 SUnit, the original Smalltalk version written by Kent Beck based on which JUnit was written
 TestNG, another test framework for Java
 Mock object, a technique used during unit testing
 Mockito, a mocking library to assist in writing tests
 EvoSuite, a tool to automatically generate JUnit tests
 List of Java Frameworks

References

External links

 
 
 

Cross-platform software
Extreme programming
Free software programmed in Java (programming language)
Java development tools
Java platform
Unit testing frameworks
Software using the Eclipse license
Articles with example Java code